Amalia Ercoli Finzi (née Amalia Ercoli; born 20 April 1937) is an Italian engineer and professor, Principal Investigator of the SD2 drill aboard the Philae spacecraft.

Early life and education 
Ercoli Finzi was born at Gallarate, near Milan.

In 1962 she was the first Italian woman to graduate in aeronautical engineering, from the Polytechnic University of Milan, with a final grade of 100/100 cum laude.

Research and career 
She has taught at the Polytechnic University of Milan for more than fifty years, becoming associate professor in 1980 and professor in 1994. She has served as Professor of Orbital Mechanics, Director of the Department of Aerospace Engineering and on the board of Directors of the National Museum of Science and Technology. She has considerable experience in space flight dynamics. She has served as a scientific advisor for NASA, ASI and ESA and is an honorary lecturer at Milan's Politecnico university.

She has been involved with several NASA - Italian Space Agency missions, including space tether missions, MiTEx and Columbus (ISS module). She was responsible for the SD2 instrument, which drilled the surface of 67P/Churyumov–Gerasimenko, collected materials and took them for analysis.

Ercoli is married to Filiberto Finzi, son of Italian mathematician Bruno Finzi. The couple have five children.

Awards and honors 
In 2012 she won the Franck J. Malina Astronautics Medal from the International Astronautical Federation. She was also awarded the Leonardo Award for Lifetime Achievement from the Italian Association of Science Journalists for her contributions to the exploration of space and education. Ercoli is an advocate for women in science, and speaks up against stereotypes and bias. In 2017 she won the Premio Porto Venere Donna award which is given annually by the Provincial Council of Women to recognise the most influential women in Italy. 

In 2018, the asteroid 24890 Amaliafinzi was named after her.

A Turin-based working copy of the latest Mars rover was named after Finzi in January 2022 by the European Space Agency. The model will simulate all the rover's actual moves on Mars.

References 

Italian astrophysicists
Women astrophysicists
Italian aerospace engineers
1937 births
Living people
People from Gallarate
Italian women engineers
20th-century Italian engineers
21st-century Italian engineers
21st-century women engineers
Polytechnic University of Milan alumni
Academic staff of the Polytechnic University of Milan
20th-century women engineers
Women planetary scientists
Planetary scientists
20th-century Italian women
21st-century Italian women